Either Herman Albertus "Herman" Levij (15 April 1904, Rotterdam – 12 December 1983) or Heinz Levy (29 April 1904, Hannover - 31 March 1944 Auschwitz) was a Dutch boxer who competed in the 1924 Summer Olympics. In 1924 he was eliminated in the second round of the featherweight class after losing his fight to the upcoming silver medalist Joseph Salas.

References

1904 births
1983 deaths
Featherweight boxers
Olympic boxers of the Netherlands
Boxers at the 1924 Summer Olympics
Dutch Jews
Jewish Dutch sportspeople
Boxers from Rotterdam
Dutch male boxers